Georgi Andreyevich Zotov (born 12 January 1990) is a Russian professional football player. He plays as a right back for Krylia Sovetov Samara. He also played as a left back and left midfielder.

Club career
On 26 July 2019, he joined FC Orenburg on loan.

On 17 August 2020, he signed a contract with Rubin Kazan for the 2020–21 season.

On 24 August 2022, Zotov returned to Krylia Sovetov Samara. He signed a contract until the end of the 2022–23 season.

Career statistics

References

External links
 
 

1990 births
Sportspeople from Novosibirsk
Living people
Russian footballers
Association football defenders
Association football midfielders
FC Lokomotiv Moscow players
FC Novokuznetsk players
FC Salyut Belgorod players
FC Metalurh Donetsk players
FC Anzhi Makhachkala players
FC Kuban Krasnodar players
PFC Krylia Sovetov Samara players
FC Orenburg players
FC Rubin Kazan players
Russian Premier League players
Russian First League players
Russian Second League players
Ukrainian Premier League players
Russian expatriate footballers
Expatriate footballers in Ukraine
Russian expatriate sportspeople in Ukraine